is a railway station on the Tazawako Line in the town of Shizukuishi, Iwate Prefecture, Japan, operated by East Japan Railway Company (JR East).

Lines
Shizukuishi Station is served by the Tazawako Line and the Akita Shinkansen, and is located 16.0 km from the terminus of both lines at Morioka Station.

Station layout
Shizukuishi Station is an elevated station with a single side platform and an island platform. The station has a Midori no Madoguchi staffed ticket office.

Platforms

History
Shizukuishi Station opened on June 15, 1921. The station was absorbed into the JR East network upon the privatization of JNR on April 1, 1987. Services on the Akita Shinkansen began on March 22, 1997.

Passenger statistics
In fiscal 2015, the station was used by an average of 549 passengers daily (boarding passengers only).

Surrounding area
 Amihari ski resort and onsen
 Oushuku Onsen
 National Route 46

See also
 List of Railway Stations in Japan

References

External links

  

Railway stations in Japan opened in 1921
Railway stations in Iwate Prefecture
Akita Shinkansen
Tazawako Line
Shizukuishi, Iwate
Stations of East Japan Railway Company